The Rio Grande Foundation is a free market economic policy think tank and taxpayer watchdog group based in Albuquerque, New Mexico. It is affiliated with the U.S. nationwide State Policy Network. It was founded in 2000 by Hal Stratton, a former state representative and Attorney General of New Mexico, and Harry Messenheimer, an economist then at George Mason University. Paul Gessing became president in 2006. The group is a 501(c)(3) tax-exempt organization.

Activities

The Wall Street Journal ran an article on January 19, 2009, outlining several allegations of state corruption in New Mexico and pointing to the state's lack of comprehensive ethics laws as a possible cause. On January 29, The Wall Street Journal published a letter by Rio Grande Foundation president Paul Gessing, suggesting that government transparency would improve New Mexico's political situation. Gessing pointed out that the legislature had failed to follow through with any of the proposed ethics reforms of recent years. He suggested that the legislature begin Webcasting its sessions to give citizens the opportunity to monitor their government's actions.

In 2009, the Rio Grande Foundation president Paul Gessing criticized the creation of a Department of Motor Vehicles and Hispanic Affairs Department in New Mexico, an idea proposed in two bills introduced in the New Mexico legislature. In an interview with the Santa Fe New Mexican, Gessing said, "the last thing we need is to hire more highly-paid cabinet-level state bureaucrats."

The Rio Grande Foundation "made a big splash" in its fight against a streetcar project in Albuquerque; several members of the group spoke in opposition to the streetcar at the City Council, and the Foundation supported an anti-streecar group called Stop Wasting Albuquerque Taxes (SWAT).

References

External links

 
 Organizational Profile – National Center for Charitable Statistics (Urban Institute)

Charities based in New Mexico
Government watchdog groups in the United States
Organizations based in Albuquerque, New Mexico
Tax reform in the United States